Thomas James "Jake" McCoy (January 2, 1942 – February 5, 2021) was an American ice hockey defenseman and Olympian.

McCoy played with Team USA at the 1964 Winter Olympics held in Innsbruck, Austria. He later played one year for the Minnesota Nationals in the United States Hockey League before going on to a career as a high school teacher, during which he coached high school hockey teams including that of Richfield High School.

He died one month and three days after his 79th birthday.

References

1942 births
2021 deaths
Ice hockey players at the 1964 Winter Olympics
Olympic ice hockey players of the United States
American men's ice hockey defensemen
Ice hockey people from Minneapolis
Minnesota Golden Gophers men's ice hockey players